Diego da Silva Rosa (born 22 March 1989), known as Diego Rosa, is a Brazilian professional footballer who plays as an attacking midfielder for Manaus.

Honors
Vasco da Gama
Copa do Brasil: 2011

References

External links

1989 births
Living people
Brazilian footballers
Campeonato Brasileiro Série A players
Campeonato Brasileiro Série B players
Campeonato Brasileiro Série C players
Esporte Clube Juventude players
CR Vasco da Gama players
Associação Atlética Ponte Preta players
Agremiação Sportiva Arapiraquense players
ABC Futebol Clube players
Paulista Futebol Clube players
Clube de Regatas Brasil players
Clube Atlético Penapolense players
Luverdense Esporte Clube players
Esporte Clube Bahia players
Atlético Clube Goianiense players
J2 League players
Montedio Yamagata players
Brazilian expatriate footballers
Brazilian expatriate sportspeople in Japan
Expatriate footballers in Japan
Association football midfielders
People from Campo Grande
Sportspeople from Mato Grosso do Sul